Pompeii Records was an American record company and label formed in 1968 in Dallas by Joe Perry, president, and Pat Morgan, chairman of the board. Distributed by Atco Records in the US and by London Records internationally,  the company is noted for their Ike & Tina Turner releases in the late 1960s.

Overview 
Joe Perry formerly of Big State Distributors formed a partnership with Pat Morgan and launched Pompeii Music Corp. which included two labels, Pompeii Records and Innis Records.  Innis was founded by Ike Turner in the early 1960s and had already released a handful of singles.

The first release from Pompeii was the single "So Fine" by Ike & Tina Turner in March 1968.

Pat Morgan, former nightclub owner, who was also producer at Pompeii and eventually became the president. In 1969, he merged the company with the publicly owned corporation Computer System Management, and Pompeii was renamed CSM-Pompeii. The subsidiary labels Vesuvius and Turtle Creek were also added. Turtle Creek was formed to handle country artist.

The company owned their own pressing plant, Reco-Press of Dallas, which printed all of the Pompeii labels as well as others.

Roster 

Acts signed to Pompeii included:

 Ike & Tina Turner
 The Ikettes
 Don "Jake" Jacoby
 Les Watson & the Panthers
 LeRoy Horne
 Salt & Pepper
 Wild Turkey
Fontella Bass
 Dale McBride
 Jimmy Taylor
 Delores Johnson
 Scotty McKay

Selected discography

Albums 

 1968: Ike & Tina Turner – So Fine
 1969: Ike Turner – A Black Man's Soul
 1969: Ike & Tina Turner – Cussin', Cryin' & Carryin' On
 1970: Caleb Brooks – And Now ... Caleb Brooks

Singles

References 

Record labels established in 1968
Defunct record labels of the United States
Rhythm and blues record labels
Jazz record labels
Record labels based in Texas